Manena is a common name for several Hawaiian plants and may refer to:

Melicope cinerea
Melicope hawaiensis